Pseudoceryx is a monotypic moth genus in the subfamily Arctiinae. Its single species, Pseudoceryx dohertyi, is found in New Guinea. Both the genus and species were first described by Rothschild in 1910.

References

Arctiinae